The 2022 Thomas Cup qualification process is a series of tournaments organised by the five BWF confederations to decide 14 of the 16 teams which will play in the 2022 Thomas Cup, with Thailand qualifying automatically as hosts, and Indonesia qualifying automatically as trophy holder.

Qualification process 
The number of teams participating in the final tournament is 16. The allocation of slots for each confederation is the same allocation from 2016 tournament; 4 from each Asia and Europe, and 1 from each Africa, Oceania and Pan Am. Two automatic qualifiers are the host and defending champion. The remaining quota will be filled by world team ranking.

Qualified teams

Confederation qualification

Badminton Confederation of Africa

The qualification for the African teams was held from 14 to 17 February 2022, at the Lugogo Arena, in Kampala, Uganda. The winners of the African qualification will qualified for the Thomas Cup.

Teams in contention
Teams qualified for the Group stage

First round (group stage)

Second round (knockout stage)

Badminton Asia

The qualification for the Asian teams was held from 15 to 20 February 2022, at the Setia City Convention Centre in Shah Alam, Selangor, Malaysia. The semifinalist of the Asian qualification will qualified for the Thomas Cup. Indonesia qualified automatically as trophy holder .

Teams in contention 
Teams qualified for the Group stage

First round (group stage)

Second round (knockout stage)

Badminton Europe 
The 2022 European Men’s & Women’s Team Championships were cancelled due to Covid-19. Therefore, the qualification for European teams are through World Ranking. The best four of the European men's team rankings will qualified for the Thomas Cup.

Badminton Oceania 
The 2022 Oceania Badminton Team Championships were cancelled due to Covid-19. Therefore, the qualification for Oceania teams are through World Ranking. The best one of the Oceania team rankings will qualified for the Thomas Cup.

Badminton Pan Am 

The qualification for the Pan Am teams was held from 17 to 20 February 2022, at the Mundo Imperial in Acapulco, Mexico. The winner of the Pan Am qualification will qualified for the Thomas Cup.

Teams in contention 
Teams qualified for the Group stage

First round (group stage)

Second round (knockout stage)

World team rankings

Summary of qualification 
Below is the chart of the BWF World Team Ranking calculated by adding World Ranking points of top three Men's Singles players and top two Men's Doubles pairs on 22 February 2022.

References 

Qualification